Henderson is a town in Buenos Aires Province, Argentina. It is the administrative centre for Hipolito Yrigoyen Partido.

The economy of the town and locality is dominated by agriculture and farming.

People from Henderson
Claudio Caniggia, former footballer
Antonio Piergüidi, current footballer
Alejandro Ávila, musician

Radio and TV
FM Bangkok 91.9 MHz. - LRI 968 
FM Amanecer 92.5 MHz. - LRI 970
FM Color 96.7
FM Luz de mi ciudad 100.1
TL2 - Canal 2 Cablevisión

External links

 Henderson Weather Station

Populated places in Buenos Aires Province